F. communis may refer to:
 Ferula communis, the giant fennel, a plant species in the genus Ferula
 Frontinella communis, the bowl and doily spider, a sheet weaver spider species

See also
 Communis (disambiguation)